Total Fucking Darkness is the third demo by the British extreme metal band Cradle of Filth, recorded in 1992 and released commercially in remastered form in 2014. The remastered release includes "Spattered in Faeces", the only surviving track from the band's abandoned first album Goetia, along with four tracks recorded at a rehearsal session in October 1992.

Track listing

Track 1 recorded at Springvale Studios in 1992.
Tracks 2–6 recorded and mixed in three days at Portacabin Studios, Westerfield, Suffolk on 4 tracks. 
Tracks 7–10 recorded during rehearsal, Springvale Studios, Samhain 1992.

Personnel
Cradle of Filth
Dani Filth – vocals, lyrics, artwork, producer
Paul Allender – lead guitar
Paul Ryan – rhythm guitar, engineering assistant, producer
Benjamin Ryan – keyboards
Robin Graves – bass
Darren Gardner – drums

Production
Jim Partridge – engineering

Additional production
Alan Bint – recording, mixing on "Spattered in Faeces"
Mark Bint – recording, mixing on "Spattered in Faeces"
Frater Nihil – producer, layout, design
Tim Turan – remastering
Daniel P. Carter – artwork

References 

Cradle of Filth albums
1992 albums
Black metal albums by English artists